Li Jianbo, may refer to:

Li Jianbo (politician), Chinese politician.
Li Jianbo (race walker), Chinese race walker.